Relations between Indonesia and Palestine have been very close and friendly. Indonesia has refused to recognize the State of Israel until a peace agreement is reached between Israel and the State of Palestine. Indonesia has strongly stood up for the rights and freedoms of the Palestinians and has supported the struggles of the Palestinians.

History
Palestine was one of the earlier supporters of Indonesian independence in 1945. Grand Mufti of Jerusalem and Supreme Leader of the Council of Palestine, Sheikh Muhammad Amin al-Husaini was credited to raise other Arab states recognition of Indonesia, particularly through Arab League. They also agreed to pressure the British whose troops had arrived in Indonesia ahead of the Dutch, not to support the Dutch. As a result, Indonesia was particularly hostile towards relations with Israel from the very beginning as a gratitude toward the Palestinians. Indonesian Presidents Sukarno strongly supported the Arab States' aggression and struggle against Israel. Even after the fall of Sukarno and the rise to power of General Suharto, Indonesia strongly supported the cause of the Palestinians. The Leader of the Palestine Liberation Organization, Yasser Arafat had visited Indonesia in 1984 and in 1993. With the fall of New Order, Abdurrahman Wahid attempted to improve relations with Israel but he was removed from office in July 2001 and no effort was maintained to improve the relations between Indonesia and Israel. In 1988 official relations began between Indonesia and Palestine with the Indonesian recognition of Palestine. In 1990 an embassy was opened in Jakarta.

Bilateral relations

Indonesia had welcomed the Palestinian Declaration of Independence by the Palestinian National Council in Algiers, Algeria, and had recognized the State of Palestine on 16 November 1988. A year later both Indonesia and Palestine signed Joint Communique on the Commencement of Indonesia-Palestine Diplomatic Relations at Ambassadorial Level, on 19 October 1989. The signing was conducted by Minister for Foreign Affairs of the Republic of Indonesia, Ali Alatas, and an official of the Palestine Liberation Organization, Farouk Kaddoumi. Following the signing ceremony, the Palestinian Minister for Foreign Affairs commissioned the Embassy of the State Palestine in Jakarta.
   
Indonesia assigned its Head of Mission to the Republic of Tunisia as the Ambassador non-resident for Palestine. This arrangement lasted until 1 June 2004, when the assignment was transferred to Indonesia's Ambassador for the Hashemite Kingdom of Jordan in Amman.

During a visit to Jordan in May 2006, the President of Indonesia Susilo Bambang Yudhoyono reiterated Indonesia's support for Palestinian independence including through the resumption of peace talks, as well as expressing Indonesia's concern over the Palestinian conditions, including in terms of finance, amidst the economic sanctions imposed by Israel.

High level visits
The Leader of the Palestine Liberation Organization, Yasser Arafat had visited Indonesia for several times; in 1984 to meet Suharto, in September 1992 to attend 10th Non-Aligned Movement Summit in Jakarta, in 1993 and again in August 2000 to meet Indonesian President Abdurrahman Wahid in Jakarta.

On 21–23 October 2007, Palestinian President Mahmoud Abbas conducted his first-ever official State visit to Indonesia. During his visit, President Abbas had signed several agreements on cooperation with Indonesia. The Agreements included cooperation in the areas of communications and education. Abbas visited Indonesia again in May 2010 and February 2014.

Criticism of recent Israeli policies
In December 2008, during the Gaza War, Indonesian President Susilo Bambang Yudhoyono said the Indonesian government remained consistent in supporting the struggle of the Palestinian people to maintain their rights and sovereignty. He said that "Israel's unproportionally all-out war on Hamas with a great number of fatalities is an unforgettable human tragedy. We invite all parties to help stop the Israeli attacks and we will continue to support the Palestinian struggle. Indonesia finds it necessary for the UN Security Council to make a formal meeting and issue a resolution to force Israel to halt its aggression."

After the 31 May 2010 Gaza flotilla raid, Indonesian President Susilo Bambang Yudhoyono condemned Israeli action. Foreign Minister Marty Natalegawa also condemned the action and said that the Israeli blockade in Gaza is a violation of international law.

During the 2014 Israel-Gaza conflict, Indonesian government condemned the ongoing Israeli military aggression in Palestine's Gaza area, saying such an onslaught may ruin conditions towards creation of peace between Palestine and Israel. "Israel's move needs to be opposed. A military aggression that worsens the suffering that has been suffered by Palestinians in Gaza and West Bank until today due to siege which is actually a' collective punishment' against Palestine people," said Indonesian Foreign Affairs Minister Marty Natalegawa. During the campaign for his 2014 election, President Joko Widodo also condemned Israel's attack on Gaza.

See also
Foreign relations of Palestine
Foreign relations of Indonesia

References

Palestine
Bilateral relations of the State of Palestine
Indonesia–State of Palestine relations